Orson is an unincorporated community in Harrison County, in the U.S. state of Iowa.

History
Orson was laid out in 1899 when the railroad was extended to that point. The community was named for Orson Pratt Edmonds. A post office was established at Orson in 1900, and remained in operation until it was discontinued in 1957.

Orson's population in 1925 was 35.

References

Unincorporated communities in Harrison County, Iowa
Unincorporated communities in Iowa